Patrick Allen Jones II (born September 29, 1998) is an American football outside linebacker for the Minnesota Vikings of the National Football League (NFL). He played college football at Pittsburgh.

Early life and high school
Jones grew up in Chesapeake, Virginia and attended Grassfield High School. As a senior, he recorded 83 tackles, 12.5 tackles for loss and 8.5 sacks and was named All-Tidewater. Jones committed to play college football at Pittsburgh over offers from Virginia Tech, California, Duke, Illinois, and NC State.

College career
Jones enrolled at Pittsburgh a semester early and redshirted his true freshman season. As a redshirt freshman, he made seven total tackles and recorded a half of a sack. Jones entered the defensive line rotation as a redshirt sophomore and finished the season with 23 tackles, 7.5 tackles for loss, four sacks and a forced fumble. Jones became a starter going into his redshirt junior year and was named second team All-Atlantic Coast Conference after recording 43 tackles, 12 tackles for loss, 8.5 sacks, four forced fumbles and 18 quarterback hurries.

Going into his redshirt senior year, Jones was named to the Chuck Bednarik Award, Ted Hendricks Award and Bronko Nagurski Trophy watchlists and was considered to be one of the top prospects at his position for the 2021 NFL Draft. Jones was named the ACC Defensive Lineman of the Week and the Chuck Bednarik Award Player of the Week for the third week of the season after recording six tackles with three sacks and three tackles for loss in a 23-20 win over Louisville and again the following week after a three sack performance against Boston College. Jones finished the year with 44 tackles, 13 tackles for loss, nine sacks and a fumble recovery.

Professional career

Jones was drafted by the Minnesota Vikings in the third round (90th overall) of the 2021 NFL Draft. The Vikings obtained the aforementioned third round selection after trading defensive end Yannick Ngakoue to the Baltimore Ravens.

References

External links
Minnesota Vikings bio
Pittsburgh Panthers bio

1998 births
Living people
Players of American football from Virginia
Sportspeople from Chesapeake, Virginia
American football defensive ends
Pittsburgh Panthers football players
All-American college football players
Minnesota Vikings players